Bally Halt railway station is a station of Eastern Railway in Howrah. It is part of the Kolkata Suburban Railway system. Dankuni and Bardhaman local train connects this place to Sealdah Station and other stations of the Sealdah main line. It is an important railway station between Dum Dum and Dankuni railway stations.

History 
Sealdah–Dankuni line was opened in 1932 by the Eastern Bengal Railway. The line was electrified on 1965.

The station

Station layout

Platform layout

Track layout

References

Railway stations in North 24 Parganas district
Sealdah railway division
Kolkata Suburban Railway stations
1865 establishments in British India
Railway stations opened in 1865